Bacterial kidney disease (BKD, also known as white boil disease) is a systemic infection caused by the bacterium Renibacterium salmoninarum. The disease affects populations of wild salmonid. BKD was originally discovered in the Scottish rivers of Dee and Spey in 1933.

Notes

References 
Eissa, A.E., 2005. Bacterial kidney disease (BKD) in Michigan salmonids. PhD Dissertation. Michigan State University, East Lansing, Michigan, USA.210pp
 
 
 
 
 
 
 
 
 
 
 
 

Bacterial diseases of fish